Jovan Branislav Todorovic is a Serbian American born artist and filmmaker based in New York. He works in film, photography, and music. He has directed The Belgrade Phantom, and short films Juvenile and You're Dead, America.

Early life and education

Jovan Todorovic was born on October 13, 1979, in Belgrade, Serbia and grew up with his parents Marija and Branislav Todorovic, both mechanical engineers and university professors. His grandmother Natalija Đukić was a concert pianist, his uncle Nikola Todorović a painter and his other uncle Đorđe Todorović a singer.

He grew up moving between the United States and Serbia as his parents taught in Universities in the United States and Serbia. While attending West Middle School in Lawrence Kansas in 1993 Jovan was introduced to analogue photography.

After high school in 1998 he attended Columbia College in Chicago and studied film for one year. In 1999 after the NATO bombing of Serbia Jovan moved back to Serbia and transferred to the Faculty of Dramatic Arts in Belgrade where he continued studying Film and TV directing and earned an MFA in Film and TV Directing.

Career
During his freshman year at Columbia College Chicago Jovan met Chad Anderson, vocalist and guitarist of The Strike, and made a music video for their track "Shots Heard Around The World"

Jovan co-produced, wrote and directed his graduation project, the feature film, The Belgrade Phantom. The film is a Serbian, Hungarian and Bulgarian co-production and was funded through Eurimages and the Jan Vrijman Film Fund. Released in 2009, the Drama, Thriller, Documentary film is a Serbian Historical Drama taking place in post-war Yugoslavia. The film revolves around a mysterious driver managing to constantly escape police in a stolen car. The Belgrade Phantom was Jovan's graduation film. The film premiered at the IDFA Festival in Amsterdam in 2009 and won the Silver Eye award at the Ji.hlava International Documentary Film Festival 2009, the award for the Best Documentary Film at the Gotham Screen Film Festival in New York 2009, and the FIPRESCI award at Fipresci Serbia in 2010. In 2011 The Belgrade Phantom was shown in the Pompidou as part of the Hors Pistes exhibition in 2011.

Jovan is the co-founder and managing director of EMOTE films along with Bogdan Petkovic.

In New York City in 2009, Jovan met Kool A.D. vocalist of Boy Crisis, an American band influenced by post-disco–post-punk sound. As part of the directing collective ESNAF Jovan directed the music video for the track called "L'Homme". The album L'Homme was supposed to be released in 2009 but due to problems with the record label, it never was. Despite the absence of a released album, along with two other official music videos, "L'Homme" was released in 2009. The video was awarded a Vimeo Staff Pick.

Jovan moved to New York City and continued directing music videos. Subsequently, Jovan directed a video for Kool A.D. and his track Pleasance. Further music videos include Jessie Ware "Spotlight", Major Lazer ft. Anitta "Make It Hot," Haleek Maul "Money God," Vaults "Midnight River," Astronomyy "Not Into U," "When I'm With You," "All I Need," Sohn "Hard Liquor," Okay Kaya "Durer," Rosie Lowe "Birdsong," and others.

In 2013 in New York Jovan began working as a fashion photographer represented by SEE management. His photography was published in print and online magazines such as Interview, Oyster, Flaunt, Teeth, Grey Magazine, etc. He photographed the cover for Katy Perry's perfume "Indi," campaigns for H&M, and musicians Bernard Jabs, Disclosure, Marian Hill.

Jovan spent 2015 living on and off inside the Juvenile Detention Center in the South of Serbia filming the daily life of youth inside the facility. The film Juvenile which premiered on Dazed was praised and led Jovan to continue filming and make the feature-length film Juvenile in 2022.

In 2018 as part of Motionpoems and under the theme "Dear Mr. President" Jovan made the short film "You're Dead, America,'' illustrating the poem with the same name written by Danez Smith.

Jovan's commercial work is recognized for dealing with social and human issues and topics. His campaign for Adidas "See My Creativity" dealt with recognizing women in sports. The Diesel campaign "Hate Couture," featuring Nicki Minaj, Gucci Mane and Bella Thorne has won numerous awards including four Cannes Lions Awards in 2019 and dealt with online hate and bullying. His commercial for Nike Japan in 2020. "You Can't Stop the Future" has provoked a political and social up-roar that led to some of the first serious discussions on race and prejudice in Japan's recent times and has been featured throughout world news and media. The commercial for Veteran Affairs entitled "Boil" aims to help prevent suicide amongst US veterans.

While in Japan In 2020 Jovan met Yurina Goto, a dancer from Fukuoka with whom he made a music video for the Japanese musician Vaundy  and his track "Fukakouryoku." The music video which features hand drawn animations by Marija Knezevic and Mihailo Prostran was awarded a Vimeo Staff Pick and featured as part of the exhibition at the UNESCO World Cultural Heritage Site at the Völklingen Ironworks and subsequent publication "The World of Music Video."

Represented commercially by Anonymous Content, an entertainment company based in Los Angeles. Jovan is a member of the Directors Guild of America.

Jovan resides between Brooklyn, NY and Belgrade, Serbia.

Filmography

Director
 2020 Jessie Ware: Spotlight
 2019 Major Lazer & Anitta: Make It Hot
 2018 Adidas: See My Creativity
 2018 JennAir: Bound by Nothing 
 2018 Rosie Lowe: Birdsong
 2017 You're Dead, America
 2017 Synthetic Overture
 2016 Okay Kaya: Durer
 2016 Juvenile
 2009 The Belgrade Phantom
 2005 Drzava izlaza
 2003 The Next Letter
 2002 Hu - Covek kao armija (Short)
 2001 Gandor: The Hunt for the Nirdal
 2000 Istorija moje bolesti

References

External links
 

Living people
American filmmakers
Year of birth missing (living people)